Natural Bridges National Monument is a U.S. National Monument located about  northwest of the Four Corners boundary of southeast Utah, in the western United States, at the junction of White Canyon and Armstrong Canyon, part of the Colorado River drainage. It features the thirteenth largest natural bridge in the world, carved from the white Permian sandstone of the Cedar Mesa Formation that gives White Canyon its name.

The three bridges in the park are named Kachina, Owachomo, and Sipapu (the largest), which are all Hopi names. A natural bridge is formed through erosion by water flowing in the stream bed of the canyon.  During periods of flash floods, particularly, the stream undercuts the walls of rock that separate the meanders (or "goosenecks") of the stream until the rock wall within the meander is undercut and the meander is cut off and the new stream bed then flows underneath the bridge. Eventually, as erosion and gravity enlarge the bridge's opening, the bridge collapses under its own weight. There is evidence of at least two collapsed natural bridges within the Monument.

History
Humans have lived in the area around Natural Bridges since as early as 7500 BCE, as shown by rock art and stone tools found at nearby sites. Around 700 CE ancestors of modern Puebloan people moved to the site, and constructed stone and mortar buildings and granaries. These structures share similarities with those found in Mesa Verde National Park, which can be seen distantly, to the east, from the Bears Ears on the park's eastern border. Like the people of Mesa Verde, the residents of Natural Bridges seem to have left the region around the year 1270.

Europeans first visited the area in 1883 when gold prospector, Cass Hite followed White Canyon upstream, from the Colorado River, and found the bridges near the junction of White and Armstrong canyons. In 1904, the National Geographic Magazine publicized the bridges and the area was designated a National Monument April 16, 1908 by President Theodore Roosevelt. It is Utah's first National Monument.

The Monument was nearly inaccessible for many decades as reflected by the visitor log kept by the Monument's superintendents. Reaching the site from Blanding, Utah, the nearest settlement, would take a three-day horseback ride. The park received little visitation until after the uranium boom of the 1950s, which resulted in the creation of new roads in the area, including modern day Utah State Route 95, which was paved in 1976.

Geology 
The bridges and other features present on the Colorado Plateau today were molded by the processes of erosion. The destructive forces of wind and rain, running water, and freezing temperatures attacked the uplifts as soon as all the tectonic havoc started in the Late Cretaceous. The Colorado Plateau has been uplifted about  since the end of the Cretaceous about 66 million years ago.

Some of this uplift occurred geologically rapidly.  As the rate of uplift increased, so did the rate of erosion. The Colorado River, for example, carved its present course within the last 6 million years. With uplift, streams throughout the Colorado Plateau began to dissect the topography into the landscape we see today with unprecedented vigor, carving the rocks and carrying away the dismantled strata into the landscape we see today.

The Monument's vegetation is predominantly pinyon-juniper forest, with grass and shrubs (brittle brush, Mormon tea, sage, etc.) typical of high-elevation Utah desert. In the canyons, where there is more water and seasonal streams, riparian desert plants, such as willow, oak and cottonwood trees, thrive. Because the Monument has been closed to grazing for nearly a century, and off-road motorized travel is restricted, Natural Bridges contains extensive areas of undisturbed, mature cryptobiotic soils.

Bridge collapse 

Earthquake potential is high along the Moab Fault in nearby Arches National Park, Southeast Utah Group (SEUG). While this and other faults in the Paradox Basin are associated with salt structures, the Colorado Plateau interior does possess a low level of seismic hazard. Ground shaking from earthquakes may impact the bridges at Natural Bridges National Monument causing catastrophic failure of one or more of the bridges.

Attractions

The main attractions are the natural bridges, accessible from the Bridge View Drive, which winds along the park and goes by all three bridges, and by hiking trails leading down to the bases of the bridges. There is also a campground and picnic areas and a visitor center within the park. Electricity in the park comes entirely from a large solar array near the visitor center. In 2007, the International Dark-Sky Association named Natural Bridges the first International Dark-Sky Park, which is a designation that recognizes not only that the park has some of the darkest and clearest skies in all of the United States, but also that the park has made every effort to conserve the natural dark as a resource worthy of protection. To date, Natural Bridges has the only night sky monitored by the NPS Night Sky Team that rates a Class 2 on the Bortle Dark-Sky Scale, giving it the darkest sky ever assessed.

Horsecollar Ruin is an Ancestral Puebloan ruin visible from an overlook a short hike from Bridge View Drive. The site was abandoned more than 700 years ago but is in a remarkable state of preservation, including an undisturbed rectangular kiva with the original roof and interior, and two granaries with unusual oval shaped doors whose shape resembles horse collars (hence the site's name).

Biology
Animal species found in the National Monument include birds such as the pinyon jay, canyon wren, and turkeys (which were reintroduced by the State of Utah to the table-lands above the Monument) and mammals like rabbits, pack rats, bobcats, coyotes, bears, mule deer, and mountain lion. The Monument's pygmy rattlesnakes have been the subject of occasional study; several species of lizard common to southern Utah are abundant. In May 2006, KSL Newsradio reported a case of plague found in dead field mice and chipmunks at Natural Bridges.

Native plant species include willow, cottonwood, Douglas fir, ponderosa pine, pinyon pine, juniper, grasses, annuals and perennials such as asters, penstemons, buckwheats, and Indian paintbrush, and various shrubs such as dwarf oaks, bayberry, manzanita, buffaloberry, rabbitbrush, blackbrush, brittlebrush, Apache's plume, sage, yucca, and Mormon tea. Invasive species include tumbleweeds, certain thistles, dandelions, and tamarisk.

Much of the Monument's ground is covered in communities of cryptobiotic soil crusts, which prevents soil erosion and promotes retention of soil nutrients.

Climate
Natural Bridges National Monument has a cold semi-arid climate (Köppen: BSk) with cold winters and hot summers.

See also
List of national monuments of the United States
Arches National Park
Dark Canyon Wilderness
Glen Canyon National Recreation Area
Manti-La Sal National Forest
Muley Point
Rainbow Bridge National Monument
Bears Ears National Monument
Hite, Utah

References

External links

 by the National Park Service
Information by AmericanSouthwest.net

National Park Service National Monuments in Utah
Colorado Plateau
Natural arches of Utah
Protected areas of San Juan County, Utah
Parks in Utah
Protected areas established in 1908
Dark-sky preserves in the United States
1908 establishments in Utah
Natural arches of San Juan County, Utah
Geotopes